The N-401 is a highway in Spain from Ciudad Real to Toledo.

It starts at the junction of the N-430, N-420 and the Autovía A-43.  It heads north from Ciudad Real over the Rio Guadiana to the Sierra de la Calderina and the Montes de Toledo before reaching Toledo.

At Toledo are junctions with the N-400, N-403 and Autovía A-42.

National roads in Spain
Transport in the Community of Madrid
Transport in Castilla–La Mancha